Sir Ernest John Strohmenger, GBE, CB (13 January 1873 – 17 June 1967) was a British civil servant.

Entering the Civil Service in 1893, he was successively Deputy Comptroller, National Health Insurance Commission in 1913, Deputy Accountant-General, Ministry of Shipping in 1917, Accountant General, Ministry of Health from 1919 to 1930, Deputy Secretary, Ministry of Health from 1930 to 1932, Under Secretary, Treasury from 1932 to 1934, Deputy Chairman, Unemployment Assistance Board, from 1934 to 1937. He retired in 1937.

After his retirement, he was a member of the Expert Committee on the Defence of India in 1938–39.

Strohmenger was appointed CB in 1919, KBE in 1927, and GBE in 1937. He was an Officer of the Legion of Honour and of the Order of the Crown of Italy.

References 

1873 births
1967 deaths
Civil servants in the Ministry of Shipping (United Kingdom)
Civil servants in the Ministry of Health (United Kingdom)
Civil servants in HM Treasury
Knights Grand Cross of the Order of the British Empire
Companions of the Order of the Bath
Officiers of the Légion d'honneur
Recipients of the Order of the Crown (Italy)